María Hernández Muñoz (born 24 March 1986) is a Spanish professional golfer on the U.S.-based LPGA Tour and Ladies European Tour.

Amateur career
An eight-year member of the Spanish National Team, Hernández is a five-time European Team Championship gold medalist, and earned a gold medal at the 2005 Mediterranean Games both individually and as a team. She won the 2003 Junior Solheim Cup and was runner up at the 2004 European Ladies Amateur Championship and again in 2008, losing a playoff to Carlota Ciganda. She was a semi-finalist at The Womens Amateur Championship.

Hernández turned in a strong collegiate career at Purdue University, which was capped off with the 2009 NCAA Division I Individual Champion and NCAA Player of the Year award. She won 13 times while with the Purdue Boilermakers, and in 2008, she won the Big Ten Conference Championship and was named the Purdue Female Athlete of the Year. She is a two-time Big Ten Conference Player of the Year, both in 2007 and 2008, and a two-time Duramed National Golf Coaches Association (NGCA) All-American First Team selection.

Professional career
Hernández turned professional in June 2009. She finished sixth at the LPGA Final Qualifying Tournament, earning her card for the 2010 LPGA Tour with ease. Her rookie season were also to be her most successful season. She won the Ladies Slovak Open on the Ladies European Tour and finished tied 14th in the 2010 Women's British Open, reaching a career peak of 112th place in the Women's World Golf Rankings. She was runner up in the 2014 Lacoste Ladies Open de France, losing by one stroke to fellow Spanish professional Azahara Muñoz.

Amateur wins 
2005 Mediterranean Games
2008 Big Ten Conference Championship 
2009 NCAA Division I Women's Golf Championships

Professional wins (1)

Ladies European Tour (1)

Team appearances
Amateur
European Girls' Team Championship (representing Spain): 2002 (winners)
European Lady Junior's Team Championship (representing Spain): 2004 (winners)
European Ladies' Team Championship (representing Spain): 2003 (winners), 2005 (winners), 2008
Junior Solheim Cup (representing the Continent of Europe): 2002, 2003 (winners)
Espirito Santo Trophy (representing Spain): 2004
Mediterranean Games (representing Spain): 2005 (winners)
Vagliano Trophy (representing the Continent of Europe): 2005

References

External links

Spanish female golfers
Purdue Boilermakers women's golfers
Ladies European Tour golfers
LPGA Tour golfers
Mediterranean Games medalists in golf
Mediterranean Games gold medalists for Spain
Competitors at the 2005 Mediterranean Games
Big Ten Athlete of the Year winners
Sportspeople from Pamplona
Spanish expatriate sportspeople in the United States
1986 births
Living people
20th-century Spanish women
21st-century Spanish women